Thomas Patrick McCarthy  (May 22, 1884 – March 28, 1933), was a Major League Baseball pitcher from 1908 to 1909. He played for the Cincinnati Reds, Pittsburgh Pirates, and Boston Doves.

External links

1884 births
1933 deaths
Baseball players from Indiana
Boston Doves players
Charleston Sea Gulls players
Cincinnati Reds players
Hartford Senators players
Major League Baseball pitchers
Mt. Clemens Bathers players
Pittsburgh Pirates players